Gralla may refer to:
Gralla (instrument), a traditional Catalan double reed instrument in the oboe family.
Gralla (municipality), a municipality in the district of Leibnitz in Styria, Austria.
Grallae, a group of long-legged birds from the 10th edition of Systema Naturae